The 2016 Generali Open Kitzbühel was a men's tennis tournament played on outdoor clay courts. It was the 72nd edition of the Austrian Open Kitzbühel, and part of the World Tour 250 series of the 2016 ATP World Tour. It took place at the Tennis stadium Kitzbühel in Kitzbühel, Austria, from July 18 through July 24.

Singles main draw entrants

Seeds

 1 Rankings are as of July 11, 2016

Other entrants
The following players received wildcards into the singles main draw:
  Jürgen Melzer 
  Dennis Novak 
  Akira Santillan 

The following players received entry from the qualifying draw:
  Kenny de Schepper 
  Daniel Gimeno-Traver
  Máximo González 
  Filippo Volandri

Withdrawals
Before the tournament
  Diego Schwartzman →replaced by  Michael Berrer

Doubles main draw entrants

Seeds

 Rankings are as of July 11, 2016

Other entrants
The following pairs received wildcards into the doubles main draw:
  Gerald Melzer /  Jürgen Melzer 
  Lucas Miedler /  Akira Santillan

The following pair received entry as alternates:
  Taro Daniel /  Daniel Gimeno-Traver

Withdrawals
Before the tournament
  Gerald Melzer

Finals

Singles

  Paolo Lorenzi defeated  Nikoloz Basilashvili, 6–3, 6–4

Doubles

  Wesley Koolhof /  Matwé Middelkoop defeated  Dennis Novak /  Dominic Thiem, 2–6, 6–3, [11–9]

References

External links
Official website

Generali Open Kitzbuhel
Austrian Open Kitzbühel
Austrian Open